Malo Lipje is a small settlement in the Municipality of Žužemberk in the historical region of Lower Carniola in southeastern Slovenia. The municipality is included in the Southeast Slovenia Statistical Region.

Name
The name Malo Lipje literally means 'little Lipje' (in contrast to the neighboring village of Veliko Lipje 'big Lipje'). The name is derived from a demonym (originally plural, *Lipľane 'residents of Lipa'), ultimately from the common noun lipa 'linden', referring to the local vegetation.

References

External links

Malo Lipje at Geopedia

Populated places in the Municipality of Žužemberk